Solariella margaritifera is a species of sea snail, a marine gastropod mollusk in the family Solariellidae.

Distribution
This marine species occurs off Japan.

References

External links
 To World Register of Marine Species

margaritifera
Gastropods described in 1964